Frank Michael DiPino (born October 22, 1956) is a former American professional baseball pitcher who played for the Milwaukee Brewers, Houston Astros, Chicago Cubs, St. Louis Cardinals, and Kansas City Royals of Major League Baseball (MLB).

On September 7, 1982, DiPino struck out ten batters in five innings for his first Major League victory. On July 21, 1986, the Astros traded DiPino to the Cubs for Davey Lopes.

DiPino was the winning pitcher for the Cubs in the first official night game played at Wrigley Field, on August 9, 1988.

DiPino has the best batting average against for any pitcher who faced Tony Gwynn more than ten times. Gwynn, a lifetime .338 hitter, was .050, going 1 for 20 with three walks.

As of 2013, DiPino was a pitching instructor for Perfect Practice of Syracuse, New York.

References

External links

1956 births
Living people
American expatriate baseball players in Canada
Baseball players from Syracuse, New York
Burlington Bees players
Chicago Cubs players
Holyoke Millers players
Houston Astros players
Kansas City Royals players
Louisville Redbirds players
Lubbock Crickets players
Major League Baseball pitchers
Milwaukee Brewers players
Newark Co-Pilots players
Omaha Royals players
Saint Leo Lions baseball players
St. Louis Cardinals players
Stockton Ports players
Vancouver Canadians players